James L. Kinsey (October 15, 1934 in Paris, Texas – December 20, 2014 in Houston, Texas)  was an American chemist, and D. R. Bullard-Welch Foundation Professor at Rice University.
He won the 1995 Earle K. Plyler Prize for Molecular Spectroscopy.
He was a 1969 Guggenheim Fellow. He was a Fellow of the American Academy of Arts and Sciences.

Life
He graduated from Rice University, with a B.A. in 1956 and PhD in 1959.
He studied the University of Upsala, and the University of California, Berkeley.
He taught at the Massachusetts Institute of Technology from 1962 to 1988.

References

External links
website

1934 births
2014 deaths
American chemists
People from Paris, Texas
Rice University faculty
Rice University alumni
Massachusetts Institute of Technology faculty
Fellows of the American Physical Society

Spectroscopists